Twin Disc, Inc. designs, manufactures and distributes power transmission equipment for a wide range of applications, including marine, off-road vehicle and industrial. The company was founded in 1918 to manufacture clutches for farm tractors. It is now a worldwide company with subsidiaries or sales offices in Asia, Europe, North America, Oceania, and South America.

United Kingdom
Twin Disc torque converters (formerly made under licence in the United Kingdom by Rolls-Royce) were fitted to the British Rail Class 125 diesel multiple units and some export diesel locomotives, e.g. NZR TR class.

References

Companies based in Racine, Wisconsin
Companies listed on the Nasdaq
Nivelles
Torque converters